These hits topped the Dutch Top 40 in 1972.

See also
1972 in music

References

1972 in the Netherlands
1972 record charts
1972